Bidaran or Bideran may refer to:
 Bidaran-e Kohneh
 Bidaran-e Now